John Kuduvakkotte (1905 – 1968) was an Indian politician. He represented Kuzhalmannam constituency in the first and second Kerala legislative assemblies.

References

1905 births
1968 deaths
Kerala politicians
Kerala MLAs 1957–1959